Akhtar ul Iman (12 November 1915  9 March 1996) was a noted Urdu poet and screenwriter in Hindi cinema, who had a major influence on modern Urdu nazm.

He won the Filmfare Award for Best Dialogue in 1963 for Dharmputra and 1966 for Waqt. He was awarded the 1962 Sahitya Akademi Award in Urdu, for his Poetry Collection, Yadein (Memories), by Sahitya Akademi, India's National Academy of Letters.

Early life and education 
Born on 12 November 1915 in Qila Patthargarh, Najibabad, in the Bijnor district of Uttar Pradesh in 1915. He was brought up in an orphanage. He gained his initial education at Bijnor, where he came in contact with poet and scholar Khurshid ul Islam, who taught at Aligarh Muslim University and developed a long association with Ralph Russell. He graduated from the Zakir Husain College at University of Delhi and completed his Masters in Urdu degree from Aligarh Muslim University.

Career
He first joined All India Radio as a staff artist. Then Iman joined the Filmistan Studio as a dialogue writer in 1945.

He preferred nazm over more popular ghazal as a mean of poetic expression. Akhtar ul Iman's language is "coarse and unpoetic". He uses "coarse" and mundane poetic expressions to make his message effective and realistic.

He left behind a substantial legacy for new generation of poets to follow which explores new trends and themes in modern Urdu poetry giving a new direction to the modern and contemporary Urdu nazm with emphasis on philosophical humanism.

Works

Books
• Iss Aabad Kharabe Mein (Urdu)-published by Urdu Academy, Delhi, India. Autobiography of a famous Urdu writer of India.

Poetry
He has published eight collections:

 Girdaab (1943)
 Aabjoo (1944-1945)
 Tareek Sayyara (1946–47)
 Yaden (1961)
 Bint-e-Lamhaat (1969)
 Naya Ahang (1977)
 Sar-o-Samaan (1982)
 Zameen Zameen (1983-1990)
 Kulliyaat-e-Akhter-ul-Iman (2000)

Play
 Sabrang (1948): a one-verse play.

Translation and compilation by others
 Zamistan Sard Mehrika (Urdu)- Last Poetic Collection of an unforgettable Urdu poet. Compiled and edited by Sultana Iman and Bedar Bakht.
 Query of the Road – Selected Poems of Akhtar-ul-Iman with Extensive Commentary by Baidar Bakht

Indian cinema
His contribution to Hindi cinema is significant, keeping in mind the number of landmark and hit movies he has contributed as a script writer (dialogue, story and screenplay). His first landmark movie was Kanoon (1960 film), which became a big hit despite the fact that it had no songs or comedy sequences. Other important movies to which he contributed as a script writer were Dharmputra (1961) – for which he received a filmfare award – Gumrah, Waqt, Patther ke Sanam, and Daagh.

The one movie which has his lyrics is Bikhare Moti.

Awards 
Literary awards

 1962: Sahitya Akademi Award – Urdu:  Yadein (Poetry)
and Numerous other literary awards.

 Filmfare Award
 1963: Best Dialogue: Dharmputra
 1966: Best Dialogue: Waqt

Filmography 
Vijay (1988) – writer
Chor Police (1983) – writer  
Lahu Pukarega (1980) – director  
Do Musafir (1978) – writer  
Chandi Sona (1977) – writer  
Zameer (1975) – writer  
36 Ghante (1974) – writer  
Roti (1974) – writer  
Naya Nasha (1973) – writer  
Bada Kabutar (1973) – writer  
Daag (1973) – writer  
Dhund (1973) – writer  
Joshila (1973) – writer  
Kunwara Badan (1973) – writer  
Dastaan (1972) – writer  
Joroo Ka Ghulam (1972) – writer  
Aadmi Aur Insaan (1969) – writer  
Chirag (1969) – writer  
Ittefaq (1969) – writer  
Aadmi (1968) – writer  
Hamraaz (1967) – writer  
Patthar Ke Sanam (1967) – writer   
Gaban (1966) – writer  
Mera Saaya (1966) – writer  
Phool Aur Patthar (1966) – writer  
Bhoot Bungla (1965) – writer  
Waqt (1965) – writer  
Shabnam (1964) – writer  
Yaadein (1964) – writer  
Aaj Aur Kal (1963) – writer  
Akeli Mat Jaiyo (1963) – writer  
Gumrah (1963) – writer   
Neeli Aankhen (1962) – writer  
Dharmputra (1961) – writer   
Flat No. 9 (1961) – writer  
Barood (1960) – writer  
Kalpana (1960) – writer  
Kanoon (1960) – writer 
Nirdosh (1950) – writer  
Actress (1948) – writer  
Jharna (1948) – writer

Death
Akhtar ul Iman died on 9 March 1996 in Mumbai.

Further reading
 Akhtar Ul Iman by Ghulam Rizvi 'gardish'. Sahitya Akademi Publications. .

References

Cited sources

External links 
 
 Verses of Akhtarul Iman
 http://www.columbia.edu/itc/mealac/pritchett/00urduhindilinks/baidarbakht/mod06akhtar.pdf
  Nazm of Akhtarul Iman
 https://books.google.com/books?id=ObFCT5_taSgC&pg=PA120&lpg=PA120&dq=akhtar+ul+iman&source=web&ots=mUzV1uyQv9&sig=VdLt-QEZp2L_f35rOkLumnvFXVs#PPA120,M1
  Modern Indian Literature, an Anthology By K. M. George, Sahitya Akademi
 https://web.archive.org/web/20110717173430/http://www.urduzoom.com/categories.php?catid=31

1915 births
1996 deaths
Urdu-language poets from India
20th-century Indian Muslims
People from Bijnor district
Delhi University alumni
Indian male screenwriters
Filmfare Awards winners
Recipients of the Sahitya Akademi Award in Urdu
20th-century Indian poets
Aligarh Muslim University alumni
Indian male poets
20th-century Indian male writers
20th-century Indian screenwriters